Newdicks Beach is located on the southeastern side of Okurei Point (Town point) in the Bay of Plenty in the North Island of New Zealand.

The beach is approximately 2 km long and is a predominantly sandy beach. The sand is predominantly quartz giving it a light coloured appearance. The occasional black patches of sand are due to the mineral titanomagnitite which comes from andesitic volcanoes.

The road which leads to the beach is privately owned (initially by the Newdicks family) and payment is required to drive down the gravel road, although it can be walked for free.

Newdicks beach borders two pa sites (ancient Māori fortifications).

Western Bay of Plenty District
Beaches of the Bay of Plenty Region